Muttaburrasaurus was a genus of herbivorous iguanodontian ornithopod dinosaur, which lived in what is now northeastern Australia sometime between 112 and 103 million years ago during the early Cretaceous period. It has been recovered in some analyses as a member of the iguanodontian clade Rhabdodontomorpha. After Kunbarrasaurus, it is Australia's most completely known dinosaur from skeletal remains. It was named after Muttaburra, the site in Queensland, Australia, where it was found.

Discovery

The species was initially described from a partial skeleton found by grazier Doug Langdon in 1963 at Rosebery Downs Station beside Thomson River near Muttaburra, in the Australian state of Queensland, which also provides the creature's generic name. The remains were collected by paleontologist Dr Alan Bartholomai and entomologist Edward Dahms. After a lengthy preparation of the fossils, it was named in 1981 by Bartholomai and Ralph Molnar, who honoured its discoverer with its specific name langdoni.

The holotype, specimen QM F6140, was found in the Mackunda Formation dating to the Albian-Cenomanian. It consists of a partial skeleton with skull and lower jaws. The underside of the skull and the back of the mandibula, numerous vertebrae, parts of the pelvis, and parts of the front and hind limbs have been preserved.

Some teeth have been discovered further north, near Hughenden, and south at Lightning Ridge, in northwestern New South Wales. At Lightning Ridge there have been found opalised teeth and a scapula that may be from a Muttaburrasaurus. A skull, known as the "Dunluce Skull", specimen QM F14921, was discovered by John Stewart-Moore and 14-year-old Robert Walker on Dunluce Station, between Hughenden and Richmond in 1987. It originates from somewhat older layers of the Allaru Mudstone and was considered by Molnar to be a separate, yet unnamed species, a Muttaburrasaurus sp. The same area produced two fragmentary skeletons in 1989. There have also been isolated teeth and bones found at Iona Station southeast of Hughenden.

Reconstructed skeleton casts of Muttaburrasaurus, sponsored by Kellogg Company, have been put on display at a number of museums, including the Queensland Museum, Flinders Discovery Centre and National Dinosaur Museum in Australia.

Description

Whether Muttaburrasaurus is capable of quadrupedal movement has been debated; it was originally thought to be an "iguanodontid"; thought recent studies indicate a rhabdodont position. Ornithopods this basal were incapable of quadrupedal movement. Originally reconstructing Muttaburrasaurus with a thumb spike, Molnar later doubted such a structure was present. The foot was long and broad, with four toes.

The skull of Muttaburrasaurus was rather flat, with a triangular cross-section when seen from above; the back of the head is broad but the snout pointed. The snout includes a strongly enlarged, hollow, upward-bulging nasal muzzle that might have been used to produce distinctive calls or for display purposes. However, as no fossilised nasal tissue has been found, this remains conjectural. This so-called bulla nasalis was shorter in the older Muttaburrasaurus sp., as is shown by the Dunluce Skull. The top section of the bulla of the holotype has not been preserved, but at least the second skull has a rounded profile.

Classification
Molnar originally assigned Muttaburrasaurus to the Iguanodontidae. Later authors suggested more basal euornithopod groups such as the Camptosauridae, Dryosauridae or Hypsilophodontidae. Studies by Andrew McDonald indicate a position in the Rhabdodontidae. A 2022 phylogenetic analysis recovered Muttaburrasaurus and Tenontosaurus as basal rhabdodontomorphs and found them to likely represent sister taxa to Rhabdodontidae.

Paleobiology

Muttaburrasaurus had very powerful jaws equipped with shearing teeth. Whereas in more derived ornithopod species the replacement teeth alternated with the previous tooth generation to form a tooth battery, in Muttaburrasaurus they grew directly under them and only a single erupted generation was present, thus precluding a chewing motion. An additional basal trait was the lack of a primary ridge on the teeth sides, which show eleven lower ridges. In 1981 Molnar speculated that these qualities indicated an omnivorous diet, implying that Muttaburrasaurus occasionally ate carrion. In 1995 he changed his opinion, suspecting that Muttaburrasauruss dental system is evolutionarily convergent with the ceratopsian system of shearing teeth. They would have been an adaptation for eating tough vegetation such as cycads.

References

Further reading 

 

Iguanodonts
Early Cretaceous dinosaurs of Australia
Paleontology in Queensland
Fossil taxa described in 1981
Taxa named by Ralph Molnar
Ornithischian genera
Albian life